ON Athletics club (OAC) is a training group of professional distance runners sponsored by On. The team is coached by Dathan Ritzenhein and was founded in August 2020 with eight original members. OAC trains primarily out of Boulder, Colorado. There is a sister club titled "OAC Europe" coached by Thomas Dreissigacker.

Colorado Sub 4 Mile 
On August 3, 2020, Joe Klecker and Olli Hoare became the first people to ever break 4 minutes in the miles on Colorado Soil. The long streak of no sub 4 miles is attributed to the elevation of the state.

Roster

Men 
 Geordie Beamish  (August 2020)
 Olli Hoare  (August 2020)
 Joe Klecker  (August 2020)
 Morgan McDonald  (June 2021)
 Yared Nuguse  (June 2022)
 Jonas Raess  (June 2022)
 Mario Garcia Romo  (June 2022)

Women 
 Carmela Cardama Báez  (June 2021)
 Leah Falland  (August 2020)
 Sage Hurta-Klecker  (June 2021)
 Alicia Monson  (August 2020)
 Josette Norris  (January 2023)
 Hellen Obiri  (January 2022)
 Sintayehu Vissa  (August 2022)

Former Members
 Alicja Konieczek  (August 2020 - October 2022)
 Emily Oren  (August 2020 - November 2021)
 Carlos Villarreal  (August 2020 - May 2022)

Records Set by OAC Athletes

Championship Results by OAC Athletes

References 

Track and field clubs in the United States